Dynamo-Kazan (formerly Raketa 1958–2008) is a professional bandy club from Kazan, Russia, established in 1958 and playing in the Russian Bandy League since 1996. The club plays at Raketa Stadium, an outdoor arena with artificial ice of 5,000 spectators' capacity in the outskirts of Kazan. 

In the 2010–11 season the club won the Bandy League for the first time, and thus became Russian bandy champions.

Honours

Domestic
 Russian Champions:
 Winners (1): 2011

Cup
 Russian Bandy Cup:
 Winners (1): 2009

International
 World Cup:
 Winners (1): 2010
 Runners-up (1): 2013
 Champions Cup:
 Winners (1): 2009

Dynamo Kazan-2
Dynamo Kazan's second team Dynamo Kazan-2 plays in the Russian Bandy Supreme League, the second tier of Russian bandy.

References

External links
 Official website 

Bandy clubs in Russia
Sport in Kazan
Bandy clubs established in 1958
1958 establishments in Russia